Rangewala is a village in the Punjab province of Pakistan. It is located at 30°49'20N 74°15'40E at an altitude of 252 metres (830 feet). The approximate population within the surrounding 7 km is 55,057 persons.

Nearby towns include Najabat and Bohge.

References

Villages in Punjab, Pakistan